Sulz is a river of Bavaria, Germany. It flows parallel to the Rhine–Main–Danube Canal for much of its length. It is a left tributary of the Altmühl in Beilngries.

See also

List of rivers of Bavaria

Rivers of Bavaria
Rivers of Germany